Evita Griskenas (born December 3, 2000) is an American individual rhythmic gymnast. She is the 2022 USA national all-around champion. She represented the United States at the 2020 Summer Olympics and finished twelfth in the qualification round for the individual all-around. She was the most decorated athlete at the 2019 Pan American Games where she won four gold medals and one bronze medal. She swept the gold medals at the 2017 Pan American Championships. She is a four-time national all-around silver medalist (2017, 2018, 2019, 2021), and the 2015 junior national all-around champion.

Early life 
Griskenas was born in Chicago, Illinois and raised in Orland Park, Illinois. Her parents, Sigitas and Olga Griskenas, are immigrants from Lithuania. Sigitas is the 1997 and 1999 World Fitness Champion, and Olga finished fifth place in Fitness Aerobics in 1997 and fourth in 1999. She has a younger brother named Nathan. She began rhythmic gymnastics at the age of four after watching Alina Kabaeva competing on television.

Career

Junior 
Griskenas competed at the 2013 U.S. Rhythmic Championships and placed tenth in hoop, fifteenth in ball, twelfth in clubs, and eighth in ribbon. She then finished eleventh in the all-around final. At the 2014 Rhythmic Challenge in Colorado Springs, Colorado, she finished fourth in clubs, fifth in ribbon, and seventh in the all-around, hoop, and ball. Then at the 2014 National Qualifier in Lake Placid, New York, she won the bronze medal in the all-around and qualified for the USA Gymnastics Championships. There, she finished fifth in ribbon, sixth in hoop and clubs, seventh in the all-around, and tenth in ball.

In February 2015, Griskenas made her international debut and finished third in the all-around at the Moscow Grand Prix Junior International Tournament. Then in March, she won the gold medals in the all-around, ball, and clubs, and silver medals in the hoop and rope at the Rhythmic Challenge. She competed at the Lisbon International Tournament and won the bronze medals in the hoop and clubs finals. She also finished fourth in ball and seventh in rope. She then won the all-around gold medal at the International Rhythmic Gymnastics Tournament held in Corbeil-Essonnes. At the National Qualifier, she won gold medals in the all-around, rope, ball, and clubs, and the bronze medal in hoop. She then won the junior all-around title at the USA Gymnastics Championships. She also won the gold medal in hoop, the silver medals in ball and clubs, and the bronze medal in rope.

Senior

2016 
Griskenas made her senior debut at the Espoo World Cup and finished twenty-first in the all-around. At the Rhythmic Challenge, she finished second in the all-around. Then at the Lisbon World Cup, she finished twenty-first in the all-around. She then finished twenty-eighth in the all-around at the Pesaro World Cup. At the Brno Grand Prix, she placed eighth in ball, ninth in ribbon, and twelfth in the all-around, hoop, and clubs. She won the gold medal in the all-around at the National Qualifier and qualified for the USA Gymnastics Championships where she finished fourth. In the event finals, she won the bronze medal in hoop and the silver medal in ribbon.

2017 
At the Rhythmic Challenge, Griskenas won the all-around silver medal. Then at the Pesaro World Cup, she finished seventeenth in the all-around. She then placed sixth in the all-around and ribbon and seventh in the hoop at the Baku World Cup. At the Sofia World Cup, she placed fifth in the ball final and eighth in the hoop final. She won the silver medal in the all-around at the USA Gymnastics Championships, and won the event titles in hoop and ribbon. In August, she competed at the Kazan World Challenge Cup and finished fifteenth in the all-around. She then competed at her first World Championships in Pesaro, Italy. In the all-around final, she placed eleventh, which was the fourth highest-ever finish for an American gymnast at the Rhythmic Gymnastics World Championships. She also advanced into both the ribbon and hoop finals along with Laura Zeng, marking the first time two American gymnasts advanced to the event finals at the World Championships. In the event finals, she finished eighth in the hoop and seventh in the ribbon. After the World Championships, she won the all-around gold medal and gold in all four apparatus finals at the Pan American Championship in Daytona Beach, Florida.

2018 
Griskenas made her season debut at the Sofia World Cup and placed ninth in the all-around and sixth in the hoop and ball event finals. Then at the Pesaro World Cup, she placed eighth in the all-around, sixth in hoop, and seventh in ribbon. She then competed at the Guadalajara World Challenge Cup and finished sixth in ribbon, seventh in hoop, eighth in clubs, and tenth in the all-around. She won the silver medal in the all-around at the USA Gymnastics Championships, and she won the gold medal in the ball final. In August, she competed at the BSB Bank World Challenge Cup in Minsk and finished sixteenth in the all-around. The next week she competed at the Kazan World Challenge Cup where she placed eighth in the ribbon final and thirteenth in the all-around. At the World Championships, Griskenas, Laura Zeng, and Camilla Feeley finished seventh in the team event, the highest ever finish for the United States. Individually, she qualified for the all-around final and placed seventeenth with a total score of 66.950. After the World Championships, she competed at the AEON Cup in Takasaki and placed fifth in the all-around and in the team competition.

2019 
Griskenas began her 2019 season at the Corbeil International Tournament in Corbeil-Essonnes, France and helped the American team win the bronze medal. Individually, she won the all-around bronze medal behind Belarusian gymnasts Alina Harnasko and Julia Evcek. In the event finals, she won the gold medal in the ball, the silver medal in ribbon behind Harnasko, and the bronze in clubs behind Talisa Torretti and Harnasko. Then at the MTM Ljubljana International Tournament, she won the all-around silver medal behind Italy's Alexandra Agiurgiuculese. She also won the hoop gold medal and the ball silver medal once again behind Agiurgiuculese. Her first World Cup of the season was in Pesaro, and she placed fifth in the ribbon, sixth in the all-around, and eighth in the hoop and ball. Then at the Sofia World Cup, she finished fifth in the hoop, sixth in the all-around and ribbon, and seventh in clubs. In May, she won the all-around silver medal behind teammate Camilla Feeley at the Rhythmic Elite Qualifier. She then competed at the Holon Grand Prix where she placed fifth all-around, sixth in ball, and seventh in hoop and ribbon. She won her third consecutive national all-around silver medal at the USA Gymnastics Championships.

Griskenas was selected to represent the United States at the 2019 Pan American Games and won five medals- gold in the all-around, ball, hoop, and ribbon, and bronze in clubs. She was the most decorated athlete in any sport at the 2019 Pan American Games. Then at the Kazan World Cup, she placed fifth in the ribbon final and eighth in the all-around. At the World Championships in Baku, Azerbaijan, the American team of Griskenas, Laura Zeng, and Camilla Feeley placed seventh. Individually, Griskenas qualified for the ball final and placed eighth with a score of 20.350. She also qualified for the all-around final where she placed eighth with a total score of 83.000. She secured one of two Olympic spots for Team USA for the 2020 Olympic Games, along with Laura Zeng, marking the first time since 1992 that the United States qualified two individual rhythmic gymnasts for the Olympics.

2020-21 
Griskenas won the all-around silver medal at the 2020 Rhythmic Challenge in Lake Placid, New York. Then in March 2020, she placed fourth in all-around at the Grand Prix Brno, and she won the bronze medal in the ball final behind Ukrainians Vlada Nikolchenko and Yeva Meleshchuk. This was her final competition of 2020 due to the COVID-19 pandemic. She returned to competition in February 2021 at the Rhythmic Challenge and won the all-around gold medal by more than four points ahead of Laura Zeng.

Griskenas competed at several events on the 2021 World Cup series. First in Sofia, she placed twenty-seventh in the all-around. Next in Tashkent, she finished twentieth. Then in Baku, she placed twenty-third in the all-around. At her final World Cup in Pesaro, she finished eighteenth. She finished second in the all-around at the 2021 USA Gymnastics Championships and was selected to represent the United States at the 2020 Summer Olympics. Her final competition prior to the Olympics was the Israel International Tournament where she swept the gold medals in the all-around and in all four events.

At the 2020 Olympic Games in Tokyo, Griskenas was the highest-placing rhythmic gymnast from Team USA, finishing twelfth in the qualification round for the individual all-around, and was the second reserve for the all-around final. After the Olympics, she competed at the 2021 World Championships and placed thirtieth in the all-around and helped the American team place ninth.

2022 
Griskenas competed in two events at the USA Rhythmic Challenge and won the gold medal in ball and the silver medal in clubs. 

At the Baku World Cup, she placed eighth in the all-around, ball, and ribbon. She won her first World Cup medal at the Portimão World Challenge Cup with a bronze in the ribbon final. 

Griskenas won her first senior national all-around title at the USA Gymnastics Championships by nearly twelve points, and she also won gold in hoop and clubs and silver in ball and ribbon.

She won her second consecutive all-around gold medal by more than two points and helped secure a gold team medal for the USA at the Pan American Championships in Rio de Janeiro. Although she qualified for event finals with first place in hoop and ribbon and sixth in clubs, Griskenas departed the event after the all-around competition to compete in the  World Games, which were happening the same week.

At the  World Games in Birmingham, Alabama, Griskenas placed fifth in ribbon and seventh in hoop.

Awards 
In December 2019, Griskenas was honored as the NextGen Female (U-20) at the inaugural Panam Sports Awards. She was named one of ten finalists for the 90th Annual AAU James E. Sullivan Award in March 2020.

Personal life
Griskenas graduated from Carl Sandburg High School in 2019. After graduating from high school, she took a gap year before enrolling full time at Columbia University, where she is now completing her fourth year. Her hobbies include practicing calligraphy, writing, reading and dancing. She speaks English, Lithuanian and Russian.

References

External links 
 
 

Living people
2000 births
American rhythmic gymnasts
Pan American Games medalists in gymnastics
Pan American Games gold medalists for the United States
Pan American Games bronze medalists for the United States
Gymnasts at the 2019 Pan American Games
Medalists at the 2019 Pan American Games
Columbia College (New York) alumni
Gymnasts at the 2020 Summer Olympics
Olympic gymnasts of the United States
21st-century American women
American people of Lithuanian descent
Competitors at the 2022 World Games